This is a list of all cricketers who have played first-class, List A or Twenty20 cricket for Eastern Province cricket team in South Africa. Seasons given are first and last seasons; the player did not necessarily play in all the intervening seasons.

A

 Faghme Abrahams, 1973/74-1986/87
 Shafiek Abrahams, 1992/93–2000/01
 Shukri Abrahams, 1986/87–1987/88
 Umar Abrahams, 1997/98–2009/10
 Walter Ackerman, 1970/71
 Colin Ackermann, 2005/06–2016/17
 Sean Adair, 2004/05–2011/12
 Luvuyo Adam, 2009/10–2018/19
 Charles Ahlfeldt, 1975/76–1977/78
 David Alers, 1978/79–1979/80
 Charles Allison, 1908/09–1910/11
 Peter Amm, 1987/88–1990/91
 Philip Amm, 1978/79–1996/97
 Ian Anderson, 1955/56–1958/59
 Sean Andrews, 1999/00
 Francois Anker, 1987/88
 Colin Archibald, 1963/64
 Sergio Arends, 2017/18
 Robert Armitage, 1971/72–1987/88
 Laurence Ashburnham, 1896/97
 Barry Assheton-Smith, 1939/40
 Hedley Austin, 1983/84–1984/85

B

 Alan Badenhorst, 1995/96–1998/99
 Threlfall Baines, 1925/26–1926/27
 Eldine Baptiste, 1991/92–1998/99
 Peter Barclay, 1987/88–1995/96
 Eddie Barlow, 1964/65–1965/66
 C Barnes, 1910/11
 Michael Barnwell, 1969/70–1970/71
 Charles Basson, 1921/22–1922/23
 Michael Basson, 1980/81
 Karl Bauermeister, 1983/84–1992/93
 Chad Baxter, 1996/97–2009/10
 Frank Bayes, 1906/07–1908/09
 Michael Beamish, 1992/93–1998/99
 Edgar Beck, 1908/09
 Mansel Bell, 1906/07
 Warren Bell, 2000/01–2013/14
 Anthony Bendel, 1962/63–1963/64
 Mark Benfield, 1999/00–2004/05
 Douglas Bennett, 1912/13
 Douglas Bennett, 1934/35–1936/37
 Hart Bennett, 1924/25–1926/27
 C Bernstein, 1939/40
 Darryl Bestall, 1975/76
 Paul Bester, 1993/94
 David Bevan, 1973/74
 Simon Bezuidenhout, 1968/69–1982/83
 Dassie Biggs, 1964/65–1980/81
 Christopher Biggs, 1994/95–1998/99
 James Bilbrough, 1928/29
 Mark Billson, 1982/83–1989/90
 Andrew Birch, 2002/03–2019/20
 Adrian Birrell, 1984/85–1997/98
 Harry Birrell, 1945/46–1956/57
 Colin Bland, 1969/70–1970/71
 Alan Blenkinsop, 1951/52–1955/56
 Brian Blenkinsop, 1954/55
 Tladi Bokako, 2010/11–2017/18
 William Boltman, 1921/22–1931/32
 Maxwell Bolus, 1924/25–1925/26
 Kenneth Bond, 1966/67–1972/73
 Godfrey Borman, 1960/61–1963/64
 Hendrik Boshoff, 1981/82
 Robert Bossenger, 1964/65
 André Botha, 1993/94
 Johan Botha, 1995/96–2003/04
 Wikus Botha, 1995/96–1996/97
 Pierre Botha, 1996/97
 Basil Bradfield, 1952/53–1956/57
 Carl Bradfield, 1993/94–2003/04
 John Brann, 1910/11–1921/22
 William Brann, 1920/21–1933/34
 Matthew Breetzke, 2010/11–2018/19
 David Brickett, 1971/72–1984/85
 Harry Bridger, 1893/94
 Alfred Britton, 1888/89–1896/97
 Charles Britton, 1888/89–1890/91
 Dennis Broad, 1981/82
 Charles Brockway, 1951/52
 James Brodie, 1961/62–1963/64
 Stephen Brookes, 1981/82–1982/83
 Eric Brotherton, 1959/60–1960/61
 Nigel Brouwers, 1998/99–2005/06
 Duncan Brown, 1991/92
 Daniel Brown, 1929/30
 Lloyd Brown, 2010/11–2017/18
 Trevor Brown, 1957/58
 Philip Bruce, 1996/97
 James Bryant, 1993/94–2003/04
 Rudi Bryson, 1988/89–1992/93
 James Buchanan, 1936/37–1939/40
 Jaco Burger, 1989/90
 E Burgess, 1922/23
 WL Burgess, 1929/30
 Michael Burkett, 1979/80–1980/81
 Mike Burton, 1964/65–1967/68
 David Butlion, 1973/74
 Andrew Butters, 1984/85–1985/86
 Duncan Buyskes, 1933/34

C

 Andrew Cadle, 1888/89–1890/91
 Henry Calder, 1896/97
 Dave Callaghan, 1983/84–2002/03
 Jock Cameron, 1929/30
 CA Campbell, 1920/21
 Hamish Campbell-Rodger, 1926/27
 David Capel, 1985/86–1986/87
 Robin Capell, 1955/56–1957/58
 Deon Carolus, 2003/04–2006/07
 Gerald Carpenter, 1888/89–1890/91
 Phil Carrick, 1976/77
 Brydon Carse, 2007/08–2014/15
 James Carse, 1981/82–1986/87
 William Catton, 1890/91
 Carey Cawood, 1947/48–1949/50
 William Cawood, 1931/32
 Thomas Chambers, 1956/57
 Vernal Charles, 2004/05–2011/12
 Mathew Christensen, 2015/16–2019/20
 Omar Christie, 1903/04
 Kirwin Christoffels, 2012/13–2017/18
 Malcolm Clark, 1950/51–1956/57
 Brian Clayton, 1977/78
 Gihahn Cloete, 2015/16–2017/18
 Cecil Closenberg, 1936/37–1937/38
 Maurice Cole, 1921/22–1925/26
 E Collier, 1920/21
 Norman Colling, 1993/94
 Ronald Colling, 1966/67–1973/74
 Michael Collins, 1979/80
 Cecil Colman, 1912/13
 Benjamin Connell, 1934/35
 Raymond Connell, 1945/46–1952/53
 James Connerty, 1920/21
 Frederick Cook, 1893/94–1904/05
 Geoff Cook, 1978/79–1980/81
 Peter Copeland, 1956/57–1962/63
 Walter Copeland, 1890/91–1891/92
 Patrick Cornell, 1957/58–1960/61
 Michael Court, 1964/65–1966/67
 Shelsley Court, 1893/94
 Gavin Cowley, 1970/71–1984/85
 Arthur Coy, 1934/35–1947/48
 Ernest Crage, 1891/92–1893/94
 Thomas Crage, 1903/04–1921/22
 Edmund Crankshaw, 1979/80
 Murray Creed, 1992/93–2001/02
 Vernon Cresswell, 1980/81–1983/84
 Basil Crews, 1958/59
 Douglas Crooks, 1902/03
 Heath Crouch, 1912/13–1920/21
 Clive Cruickshanks, 1931/32–1934/35
 Grahame Cruickshanks, 1931/32
 Alwyn Curnick, 1949/50–1950/51

D

 Grant Dakin, 1985/86
 Geoff Dakin, 1952/53–1962/63
 David Daly, 1896/97–1902/03
 Dennis Daly, 1933/34–1935/36
 Ian Daniell, 1977/78–1986/87
 Donald Davidson, 1933/34
 Eric Davies, 1929/30–1935/36
 Marchant Davies, 1921/22–1926/27
 Laurence Davis, 1950/51
 Hubert Davison, 1925/26–1929/30
 Junaid Dawood, 2016/17
 Thomas Dean, 1956/57
 Quinton de Bruin, 1994/95–1995/96
 Jade de Klerk, 2011/12–2019/20
 Charles Delbridge, 1910/11–1912/13
 Gordon Den, 1964/65–1969/70
 Jason de Reuck, 1998/99
 Brian Desfountain, 1977/78–1978/79
 JS de Villiers, 1890/91
 Desmond Dimbleby, 1936/37–1949/50
 Kenneth Dimbleby, 1933/34–1952/53
 Lazola Dipha, 1998/99–2005/06
 Douglas Dold, 1922/23–1924/25
 Brian Dold, 1956/57–1958/59
 John Dold, 1925/26–1926/27
 Brad Dolley, 2005/06–2017/18
 Corbyn Dolley, 2005/06–2011/12
 Josh Dolley, 2004/05–2011/12
 Richard Dolley, 1982/83–1990/91 
 Harold Donachie, 1989/90–1990/91
 Herbert Dorrington, 1908/09–1912/13
 Adriano dos Santos, 2007/08–2008/09
 Robert Dower, 1896/97–1906/07
 Errol Draper, 1950/51–1951/52
 Ronald Draper, 1945/46–1949/50
 Irvine Drimmie, 1939/40
 Kevin Duckworth, 1999/00–2001/02
 Herbert Dugmore, 1929/30
 John Dugmore, 1974/75
 Jon Dumbrill, 1962/63–1965/66
 Henry Dunell, 1909/10
 Clint du Plessis, 1994/95–2001/02
 Petrus du Plessis, 1988/89–1992/93
 Sydney du Toit, 1948/49–1955/56
 Nigel Dutton, 1967/68–1973/74
 John Dye, 1972/73
 Athenkosi Dyili, 2006/07–2013/14

E

 Phil Edmonds, 1975/76
 J Edwards, 1902/03
 Errol Eichstadt, 1968/69
 Dickey Elliott, 1976/77–1979/80
 Willie Els, 1978/79
 David Emslie, 1979/80–1987/88
 Howard Emslie, 1946/47–1956/57

F

 Herbert Feltham, 1945/46–1951/52
 Peter Fenix, 1965/66–1971/72
 Russell Fensham, 1979/80–1983/84
 Stephen Fensham, 1998/99–2005/06
 Wayne Fensham, 1981/82
 David Fernley, 1954/55
 David Ferrant, 1983/84–1990/91
 John Ferrant, 1956/57–1970/71
 Aubrey Ferreira, 2014/15–2017/18
 Neville Ferreira, 1933/34–1938/39
 Quentin Ferreira, 1996/97–1997/98
 Alan Finlayson, 1921/22
 Charles Finlayson, 1925/26–1931/32
 Robert Flack, 1945/46
 Shaun Flegg, 1993/94
 Kenneth Fleming, 1935/36
 Oswald Flemmer, 1929/30
 Burton Forbes, 1991/92–1994/95
 Mark Ford, 1985/86
 Clyde Fortuin, 2015/16–2018/19
 Ramsey Forword, 1952/53–1956/57
 Edward Fouche, 1960/61
 Ivor Foulkes, 1979/80–1981/82
 John Fox, 1961/62
 Thomas Francis, 1927/28
 Jeffrey Frans, 1976/77
 Gavin Fraser, 1977/78–1980/81
 John Fraser, 1920/21
 Hubert Freakes, 1931/32–1933/34
 Bruce Friderichs, 2000/01–2004/05
 Vivian Furmidge, 1926/27–1929/30
 James Furstenburg, 1979/80–1987/88
 Peter Furstenburg, 2000/01–2012/13
 Warrick Fynn, 2006/07–2009/10

G

 Ashton Galpin, 1971/72–1978/79
 John Galpin, 1935/36
 Murray Gardner, 1931/32–1934/35
 Hilary Gardner, 1939/40
 Roy Gathorne, 1952/53
 I Gedye, 1992/93–1993/94
 Jack Gentry, 1927/28
 Siviwe Gidana, 2008/09–2019/20
 Lennox Giddy, 1888/89–1903/04
 Lionel Gill, 1896/97
 Charles Gingell, 1920/21–1926/27
 Joseph Giri, 1910/11
 John Gleeson, 1974/75
 Martin Gleeson, 1893/94–1896/97
 Robert Gleeson, 1891/92–1904/05
 William Glisson, 1906/07–1922/23
 Christiaan Goetz, 1906/07
 Stephen Goldsmith, 1893/94
 John Gorton, 1938/39
 Robert Gouldie, 1939/40
 Dev Govindjee, 1977/78
 Graham Grace, 1993/94–2000/01
 Dudley Gradwell, 1964/65–1966/67
 Keith Gradwell, 1977/78–1981/82
 Glen Granger, 1951/52
 Ernest Greathead, 1925/26–1926/27
 Rowan Grebe, 1953/54–1957/58
 Claude Green, 1929/30
 Tony Greig, 1970/71–1971/72
 Albert Gubb, 1902/03
 Thomas Gubb, 1898/99–1902/03
 John Gush, 1956/57–1957/58

H

 Glen Hall, 1961/62–1963/64
 Mark Handman, 1994/95
 Rupert Hanley, 1970/71–1974/75
 Reginald Hannam, 1905/06–1912/13
 Thomas Harding, 1909/10–1910/11
 William Hards, 1926/27–1927/28
 Simon Harmer, 2009/10–2011/12
 Michael Harris, 1971/72
 G Hartman, 1939/40
 John Harty, 1956/57–1965/66
 Ronald Harvey, 1952/53–1953/54
 William Harvey, 1912/13
 Jan Havenga, 1984/85
 Graham Hayward, 1998/99–2001/02
 Nantie Hayward, 1994/95–2003/04
 Eric Haywood, 1920/21–1921/22
 Arthur Hazell, 1902/03–1908/09
 John Heath, 1990/91–1994/95
 Alan Hector, 1965/66–1967/68
 Robert Henderson, 1933/34–1937/38
 Rani Hendricks, 1977/78
 Peter Heugh, 1890/91
 Augustus Hewitt-Fox, 1905/06–1929/30
 Dudley Hibbert, 1937/38
 Harold Hibbert, 1902/03–1906/07
 Desmond Hicken, 1950/51
 Alfred Hicks, 1946/47–1956/57
 Frederick Hippert, 1902/03–1910/11
 Sid Hird, 1945/46-1948/49
 Wally Hitzeroth, 1952/53
 Anthony Hobson, 1983/84–1997/98
 Lloyd Hobson, 2009/10
 Denys Hobson, 1969/70–1970/71
 Mackie Hobson, 1989/90
 Norman Hobson, 1905/06
 Peter Holmes, 1937/38–1939/40
 Bob Homani, 1996/97–2004/05
 John Hopkins, 1981/82
 Nigel Hopley, 1981/82–1983/84
 John Hops, 1922/23
 William Hoskin, 1934/35–1939/40
 Nathaniel Howard, 2011/12
 David Howell, 1978/79–1984/85
 Grant Howell, 2004/05–2007/08
 Ian Howell, 1981/82–1983/84
 Adam Huckle, 1992/93–1995/96
 Herbert Hudson, 1893/94
 Charles Hutchings, 1985/86–1987/88

I
 Laurence Impey, 1951/52–1955/56
 Colin Ingram, 2000/01–2008/09

J

 Arno Jacobs, 2003/04–2012/13
 Davy Jacobs, 2014/15
 Peter Jamieson, 1955/56–1961/62
 Warren Jamieson, 1994/95–1995/96
 Riaan Jeggels, 1999/00–2010/11
 Kenneth Johnson, 1950/51–1953/54
 Neil Johnson, 1988/89–1991/92
 Peter Johnson, 1939/40
 D Jones, 1983/84
 Gordon Jordaan, 1948/49
 Sidney Jordan, 1954/55
 DF Joubert, 1903/04
 Harold Joubert, 1925/26

K

 Thomas Kaber, 2018/19–2019/20
 Trevor Karg, 1977/78–1979/80
 Graeme Katz, 1987/88
 Solly Katz, 1961/62
 Stuart Keevy, 1985/86–1986/87
 Collin Kelbrick, 1977/78–1980/81
 Henry Kelly, 1920/21
 Patrick Kelly, 1928/29
 Justin Kemp, 1996/97–2002/03
 Frederick Kendle, 1903/04–1904/05
 Matthew Kennedy, 2006/07–2010/11
 Deon Kilian, 1978/79
 Alwyn King, 1975/76–1977/78
 Keith Kirton, 1960/61–1963/64
 Basil Knight, 1939/40
 Hylton Knowles, 1958/59
 Tian Koekemoer, 2015/16–2019/20
 Louis Koen, 1991/92–1998/99
 Brent Kops, 1999/00–2010/11
 Garnett Kruger, 1997/98–2002/03
 Willem Kruger, 1963/64
 Akhona Kula, 2007/08–2019/20

L

 Therald Lane, 1957/58–1958/59
 Sithembile Langa, 2019/20
 Herbert Langenberg, 1989/90
 Wayne Larkins, 1982/83–1983/84
 Albert Lawrance, 1908/09–1912/13
 Andrew Lawson, 1995/96
 Terence Lazard, 1990/91
 Allan Lee, 1977/78
 John Leibbrandt, 1939/40–1946/47
 Fred le Roux, 1910/11
 Jeffrey Levey, 1973/74
 James Liddle, 1945/46–1949/50
 William Ling, 1928/29
 Henry Londt, 1908/09–1910/11
 Bryan Lones, 1985/86–1989/90
 Grant Long, 1979/80–1988/89
 Harold Long, 1952/53–1960/61
 Sean Long, 1983/84
 Vernon Longworth, 1910/11–1912/13
 Gavin Loon, 1992/93
 J Loots, 1902/03–1906/07
 Alan Louw, 1955/56
 Johann Louw, 2003/04
 Geoff Love, 1996/97–2003/04
 Harry Lovemore, 1904/05
 Cecil Lowell, 1949/50–1950/51
 David Lumsden, 1903/04–1909/10
 Bill Lundie, 1908/09–1909/10
 Murray Luscombe, 2007/08
 Rowan Lyle, 1993/94
 Bernard Lynch, 1936/37–1947/48
 Aidan Lyons, 1902/03–1908/09

M

 Sibley McAdam, 1965/66–1971/72
 William McAdam, 1970/71–1971/72
 Brian McAllister, 1953/54–1954/55
 Dennis McAllister, 1939/40
 Mike Macaulay, 1977/78–1978/79
 Frederick McCabe, 1929/30
 Rodney McCleland, 1978/79
 Rod McCurdy, 1986/87–1990/91
 Forbes McDonald, 1938/39
 Robin MacDonald, 1952/53
 Ken McEwan, 1972/73–1989/90
 Vivian Mackay, 1904/05
 Frank McKeating, 1888/89–1891/92
 Atholl McKinnon, 1952/53–1962/63
 Gary McKinnon, 1983/84–1989/90
 Archibald McNaughton, 1934/35–1948/49
 Kenneth McRobert, 1925/26–1926/27
 Athi Mafazwe, 2018/19
 Dumisani Magala, 2006/07–2016/17
 Sisanda Magala, 2004/05–2017/18
 Sihle Magongoma, 2013/14-2019/20
 John Maguire, 1989/90–1990/91
 James Maguire, 1925/26–1928/29
 Mzwandile Mahuwa, 1991/92–1993/94
 Dumisa Makalima, 2002/03–2003/04
 Lizo Makhosi, 2012/13–2019/20
 Sithembile Makongolo, 2005/06
 David Mallett, 1992/93
 Neville Mallett, 1956/57–1969/70
 George Mandy, 1926/27
 Neal Mandy, 1980/81–1983/84
 Charles Mangold, 1896/97
 Tufty Mann, 1946/47–1950/51
 Marco Marais, 2019/20
 Peter Marais, 1973/74–1975/76
 Richard Marais, 1929/30
 Wilhelm Marais, 1931/32–1939/40
 Raymond Mardon, 1929/30–1931/32
 Colin Maritz, 1930/31–1933/34
 Lulama Masikazana, 1993/94–1998/99
 Sizwe Masondo, 2011/12
 David Masterson, 2011/12–2018/19
 Michael Matika, 2007/08–2008/09
 Brett Matthews, 1988/89–1989/90
 Arthur Melvill, 1891/92–1906/07
 Mark-Anthony Mey, 1984/85
 Vincent Mey, 1991/92
 A Meyer, 1893/94
 Syd Meyer, 1990/91
 Lyall Meyer, 2001/02–2012/13
 Wollaston Meyer, 1891/92
 Johannes Michau, 1997/98
 Marcelle Michau, 1984/85–1993/94
 Ronald Michell, 1933/34
 David Millard, 1952/53–1953/54
 Gregory Miller, 1992/93–1995/96
 Wayne Miller, 1982/83-1983/84
 Noel Mills, 1933/34
 Harold Minkley, 1935/36
 David Mitchell, 1957/58
 Ian Mitchell, 2003/04
 Sinethemba Mjekula, 2004/05–2007/08
 Darren Moffat, 1997/98–1998/99
 William Moolman, 1997/98–1998/99
 Edward Moore, 2006/07–2019/20
 Grant Morgan, 1991/92–1996/97
 Ezra Moseley, 1983/84–1984/85
 William Mundell, 1963/64
 Campbell Munro, 1921/22–1926/27
 Anton Murray, 1947/48–1955/56
 Wayne Murray, 1997/98–2001/02
 G Murray, 1906/07
 Andy Murtagh, 1973/74
 Robbie Muzzell, 1974/75

N

 Henry Nash, 1951/52
 Sithembiso Ndwandwa, 2009/10–2015/16
 James Neave, 1962/63–1968/69
 Aldre Nel, 2007/08–2011/12
 Louis Nel, 1962/63–1965/66
 Ruan Nel, 2002/03–2005/06
 Aubrey Nell, 1983/84–1986/87
 Mfuneko Ngam, 1997/98–2007/08
 Lesiba Ngoepe, 2016/17–2019/20
 David Nicholas, 1925/26
 Michael Nienaber, 2001/02–2002/03
 Desmond Niland, 1934/35
 Mpilo Njoloza, 2007/08–2011/12
 Arthur Noble, 1946/47
 Anrich Nortje, 2008/09–2018/19
 Eric Norton, 1936/37–1955/56
 Mtabozuko Nqam, 2011/12–2020/21
 Solo Nqweni, 2008/09–2018/19
 Siyamtanda Ntshona, 2006/07–2009/10
 Onke Nyaku, 2012/13–2019/20

O

 Ernest Oakley, 1903/04
 Arthur Ochse, 1921/22–1937/38
 John Ogilvie, 1979/80–1985/86
 Lionel Oram, 1929/30
 Ethan O'Reilly, 2004/05–2015/16
 Henry O'Reilly, 1925/26–1927/28

P

 Hubert Pagden, 1924/25–1930/31
 Steve Palframan, 1990/91
 Gary Parker-Nance, 1985/86
 Dante Parkin, 1890/91–1896/97
 Leonard Parkin, 1891/92–1893/94
 Wayne Parnell, 2002/03–2010/11
 John Paterson, 1909/10
 Arthur Pattison, 1925/26–1928/29
 Errol Pearce, 1960/61
 Walter Pearce, 1937/38
 Michael Perrott, 1950/51–1955/56
 Thokozani Peter, 2017/18
 Andre Peters, 1991/92–1998/99
 Lyle Petersen, 2019/20
 Robin Peterson, 1994/95–2008/09
 Alfred Petty, 1910/11
 Bertie Philpot, 1926/27–1929/30
 Marcello Piedt, 2020/21
 Johnny Pieterse, 1984/85
 Horace Pittaway, 1968/69–1972/73
 Peter Pollock, 1957/58–1971/72
 Graeme Pollock, 1960/61–1977/78
 John Ponsonby, 1955/56
 Brett Pope, 1988/89
 Steven Pope, 1991/92–1994/95
 Arthur Porter, 1929/30
 Frank Porter, 1912/13–1926/27
 Ian Postman, 2003/04
 Etienne Potgieter, 2000/01–2005/06
 Ian Preston, 1947/48–1948/49
 John Preston, 1933/34
 James Price, 2004/05–2015/16
 Harry Price, 1936/37
 Michael Price, 1996/97–2016/17
 Ashwell Prince, 1995/96–1997/98
 Charles Prince, 1898/99–1903/04
 George Pringle, 1946/47–1953/54
 Meyrick Pringle, 1986/87–2001/02
 Woodrow Procter, 1938/39–1939/40
 Douglas Proudfoot, 1890/91

R

 Lennox Randall, 1937/38–1938/39
 Paul Rayment, 1985/86–1993/94
 Keith Reid, 1969/70–1980/81
 Terance Reid, 1977/78–1989/90
 Lindsay Reid-Ross, 1981/82–1983/84
 Wilhelm Rein, 1933/34–1934/35
 Alastair Rennie, 1960/61–1962/63
 Oliver Reynolds, 1945/46–1947/48
 Clinton Rhodes, 1990/91–1992/93
 Harold Rhodes, 1909/10
 Dave Richardson, 1977/78–1997/98
 Reginald Richter, 1936/37
 Douglas Riemer, 1934/35–1947/48
 Roderic Ripley, 1928/29
 Dudley Rippon, 1949/50
 Frank Rippon, 1933/34
 Douglas Ritchie, 1903/04
 Neville Ritchie, 1976/77
 Anthony Roberts, 1985/86–1986/87
 HC Roberts, 1906/07
 Luke Roberts, 1996/97–2004/05
 Brent Robey, 1979/80–1993/94
 Ronald Robson, 1933/34–1939/40
 Desmond Roe, 1945/46
 Garth Roe, 1993/94–1995/96
 Christiaan Roelofse, 1988/89–1990/91
 Malcolm Ronaldson, 1937/38
 Daniel Rossouw, 1993/94–1995/96
 R Rouse, 1939/40
 Eric Rowan, 1945/46
 Arthur Rudman, 1968/69–1970/71
 Colin Rushmere, 1956/57–1965/66
 Mark Rushmere, 1982/83–1999/00
 Robert Russell, 1978/79

S

 Curtis Samboer, 2009/10–2014/15
 Unathi Sandi, 2005/06
 Keith Sansom, 1983/84
 John Sapsford, 1952/53–1953/54
 Etienne Schmidt, 1970/71–1976/77
 Samuel Schmidt, 1967/68–1971/72
 Brett Schultz, 1989/90–1995/96
 Timothy Seaman, 1978/79–1981/82
 Malcolm Searle, 1978/79–1979/80
 Russell Searle, 1950/51
 Rudi Second, 2010/11–2019/20
 Dewald Senekal, 1998/99–2000/01
 Junaid September, 1993/94–1997/98
 Nelson Setimani, 2018/19–2020/21
 Richard Seymour, 1978/79
 Oswald Shapter, 1929/30–1936/37
 James Sharp, 1939/40
 Gareth Shaw, 1992/93–1995/96
 Neville Shaw, 1955/56
 Tim Shaw, 1980/81–1996/97
 Arthur Short, 1965/66–1974/75
 Jonathan Shutte, 1996/97–1998/99
 Ngazibini Sigwili, 2014/15–2016/17
 PW Simpson, 1904/05
 Lutho Sipamla, 2011/12–2018/19
 Mpumelelo Slwana, 2001/02–2005/06
 Johann Smit, 2013/14
 Martinus Smit, 1978/79
 Albert Smith, 1908/09–1925/26
 Clarence Smith, 1934/35–1939/40
 Gus Smith, 1964/65
 H Smith, 1896/97
 Justin Smith, 1997/98–1998/99
 Kenan Smith, 2014/15–2019/20
 Michael Smith, 2006/07–2012/13
 JJ Smuts, 2001/02–2016/17
 Kelly Smuts, 2002/03–2019/20
 Eric Smythe, 1963/64
 Andre Snyman, 1985/86–1988/89
 Abongile Sodumo, 2006/07
 William Solomon, 1905/06
 Mtimkulu Sontundu, 1993/94–1996/97
 Ralph Southey, 1938/39–1939/40
 Reginald Stanton, 1921/22
 Frank Steers, 1927/28
 A Stein, 1931/32
 John Stephenson, 1972/73–1982/83
 Bruce Stigant, 1993/94–1996/97
 Athol Stirk, 1925/26
 Michael Stonier, 1991/92
 Peter Stopforth, 1936/37
 Pieter Strydom, 1987/88–1991/92
 Kyle Stuart, 2010/11
 Tristan Stubbs, 2015/16–2020/21
 Glenton Stuurman, 2018/19–2019/20
 John Summerton, 1973/74–1974/75
 Roy Sutcliffe, 1947/48

T

 Alfred Taylor, 1912/13
 Roy Taylor, 1969/70
 Werner Terblanche, 1994/95
 Kevin Tessendorf, 1980/81
 Murray Thalrose, 1974/75
 Dennis Thane, 1982/83
 Dudley Theophilus, 1926/27–1933/34
 Juan Theron, 1998/99–2014/15
 Derek Thomas, 1973/74
 Greg Thomas, 1987/88–1988/89
 Brett Thompson, 2003/04–2006/07
 Edwin Thorogood, 1910/11
 Steytler Thwaits, 1939/40–1948/49
 Daniel Thysse, 1946/47–1947/48
 Craig Thyssen, 1998/99–2003/04
 John Timm, 1977/78–1978/79
 Ernest Tonks, 1896/97
 Lonwabo Tsotsobe, 2004/05–2006/07
 Brett Tucker, 2003/04
 Pierre Tullis, 1984/85–1993/94
 Clive Tuohy, 1956/57
 Frank Turberville, 1890/91–1891/92
 Frederick Turner, 1931/32
 Charles Twigg, 1926/27–1930/31

Notes

References

Cricket in South Africa
Eastern Province